Earlestown railway station is a railway station in Earlestown, Merseyside, England, and one of the few "triangular" stations in Britain.

History

Early history 
The station lies on the former Liverpool and Manchester Railway, which was opened on 15 September 1830. On 25 July 1831 the Warrington and Newton Railway was opened for public use, making a junction at a point in the township of Newton, facing in the direction of Liverpool.

The surviving Earlestown station buildings were constructed around 1835 on the original site, at the point of intersection of these two early railways, incidentally forming the first steam railway junction, which was given the name Newton Junction.

The junction had a very tight curvature and this caused problems. Train travelling on the curves were restricted to a slow maximum speed. The original building now forms the (currently unused) waiting room of Earlestown Station.

The Grand Junction Railway (GJR) absorbed the Warrington and Newton company as of 31 December 1834 and from the GJR's completion of their trunk line from Birmingham on 4 July 1837 used it to access the Liverpool and Manchester line. A new "Curve" was built at Newton Junction so that trains could run towards Manchester; this gave the station a triangular formation with six platforms. To complicate matters, there was also a branch line from Richard Evans's collieries at Haydock which had a curve to join the L & M in the Manchester direction and passed through the triangle to join the Warrington and Newton line.

The method of operation involved the despatch of a Grand Junction train from both Liverpool and Manchester to meet at Earlestown.  These were joined together and continued as one train to Birmingham. Both portions conveyed through carriages after 1839 to London. The Grand Junction trains arriving from Birmingham were usually split at Warrington (Bank Quay) and passed through Earlestown as separate Liverpool and Manchester trains.

An area between the station and the "Nine Arches" viaduct was selected in 1833 by Messrs Jones, Turner and Evans as the site of their Viaduct Locomotive Works. In 1853, the London and North Western Railway took a lease on the premises and thus established the company's carriage and wagon works, and the area developed into something of a 'company town' which, after the construction of company houses, was given the nickname "Earle's Town" after Hardman Earle, a director of the company and its predecessors, the Liverpool & Manchester and Grand Junction Railways. The name has stuck, despite it being corrupted to its present version and never having been an actual town.

Later history 
The London and North Western Railway later operated their main line service to the Scottish border by way of Earlestown and Parkside, utilising a short section of the old Liverpool and Manchester line. This inconvenient routing was eliminated by the construction of the Golborne cut-off, a direct connection avoiding Earlestown.

However, direct trains to  via  were withdrawn in 1964.

The remaining parts of the station were electrified as part of the North West electrification, which was announced in July 2009. This project saw the original West Coast Main Line electrification joined to the Manchester to Liverpool electrification at the east and south sides of Earlestown station. This electrification work was completed in February 2015.

Scheduled electrically-operated passenger services commenced from the station during March 2015, when the Liverpool Lime Street to Manchester Airport service converted from diesel to electric traction. Previously, despite the long-standing electrification of part of the station, no electrically operated passenger services were scheduled to call at Earlestown.

Historical status

The triangular track layout at Earlestown (originally named Newton Junction) represents the oldest junction in the world between two passenger railways, in the form of the first "stationary turntable" or wye ever constructed. Nearby on the line towards Liverpool is the Sankey Viaduct, the first mainline railway viaduct which crosses the Sankey Canal: that means that one of the earliest passenger railways crosses the first canal of the industrial revolution.

Earlestown is one of two triangular railway stations left in the UK, the other being  in West Yorkshire

The waiting room on the Liverpool-bound platform is the oldest station building in the world still in passenger service, although this is now limited to providing shelter from the rain under its canopy. The building is currently derelict, with tickets being sold in a more recent structure on the opposite side of the line.

Facilities

The ticket office is staffed for the duration of service here each day (06:00 to midnight weekdays and Saturdays, 08:30 to midnight Sundays).  Digital information screens, timetable poster boards and automatic announcements provide train running information.  All platforms have either shelters or canopies.  Only platforms 1 and 5 have step-free access, as the others are reached via the stepped footbridge between platforms 1 and 2.

Platform layout

Services 
Following completion of electrification of the line in early 2015, the LiverpoolManchester Airport, LiverpoolManchester Victoria and LiverpoolWarrington Bank Quay services are now operated by 4-car Class 319, 3-car Class 323 and 4-car  electric units. The Northern Trains Leeds to Chester service uses new Class 195 Civity DMUs

Most routes serve the station hourly in each direction, though certain trains (such as the TransPennine Express services) pass through without stopping.  The only services calling here on Sundays are on the Liverpool Lime StreetManchester Airport/ and Manchester PiccadillyChester routes.

See also
 Listed buildings in St Helens, Merseyside

References

Bibliography
 
 Liverpool & Manchester Railway 1830-1980, Frank Ferneyhough, Book Club Associates, 1980, (no ISBN)

External links

 Station information

Former London and North Western Railway stations
Newton-le-Willows
Railway stations in St Helens, Merseyside
DfT Category E stations
Railway stations in Great Britain opened in 1830
Northern franchise railway stations
Railway stations served by Transport for Wales Rail
1830 establishments in England